Tikhon Igorevich Zhiznevsky (born August 30, 1988) is a Russian theatre actor.

Early life
Zhiznevsky was born in Zelenogradsk, Kaliningrad Oblast, Russian SFSR, Soviet Union (now Russia). In classes he studied in the theater class of the Kaliningrad Lyceum No. 49.

In 2005-2009 he studied at the Boris Shchukin Theatre Institute on the course Valery Vladimirovich Fokin.

Since 2009, after graduating from theatrical institute, he became an actor of the Alexandrinsky Theatre in the city of Saint Petersburg.

Selected filmography

References

External links 
 Tikhon Zhiznevsky on kino-teatr.ru

1988 births
Living people
People from Zelenogradsk
Russian male child actors
Male actors from Saint Petersburg
Russian male stage actors
Russian male film actors
Russian male television actors
21st-century Russian male actors